The German Baltic Sea island of Wührens lies between the much larger islands of Rügen and Ummanz. 
It is uninhabited and only grass-covered. It is surrounded by the neighbouring islands of Liebes to the west, Urkevitz to the east and Mährens to the north. It is the smallest of the four islands in the channels of Wittenberger and Focker Strom.

The island lies within the Western Pomerania Lagoon Area National Park and, as a bird reserve, is out-of-bounds to the public. Municipally it belongs to Ummanz.

Islands of Mecklenburg-Western Pomerania
German islands in the Baltic
Bird reserves in Germany
Ummanz
Uninhabited islands of Germany